Veobretinden is a mountain in Lom Municipality in Innlandet county, Norway. The mountain is surrounded by several other notable mountains including Spiterhøi, Skauthøi, Leirhøi, and Veobreahesten to the northwest; Steinbukampen and Veopallan to the northeast; Veotinden to the east; Austre Memurutinden and Blåbreahøe to the southeast; Store Memurutinden to the south; and Nørdre Hellstugutinden, Midtre Hellstugutinden, Store Hellstugutinden, and Nestsøre Hellstugutinden to the southwest.

See also
List of mountains of Norway by height

References

Jotunheimen
Lom, Norway
Mountains of Innlandet